Tonia Tisdell (born March 20, 1994) is a Liberian professional footballer who plays as a left winger for Telecom Egypt.

Club career
Tisdell joined Ankaraspor in January 2009 but in summer 2009 was loaned to second division club Karşıyaka S.K. for two seasons. He scored in his first professional match and goal for his club Karşıyaka against Kartalspor in the Turkish Cup.

Mersin İdman Yurdu signed Tisdell on loan until the end of season.

On 5 August 2018, signed a one-year contract with Denizlispor.
 After six months with Nea Salamis Famagusta FC in Cyprus, Tisdell moved to Egyptian club ENPPI SC at the end of January 2020.

International career
Tisdell is a member of the Liberia national football team. On 11 October 2008, he played his first match for Liberia against Algeria.

References

 Karabükspor, Osmanlısporlu Tonia Tisdell ile anlaştı, milliyet.com.tr, 7 January 2016

External links 
 
 

1992 births
Living people
Liberian footballers
Liberia international footballers
Liberian expatriate footballers
Association football midfielders
Ankaraspor footballers
Karşıyaka S.K. footballers
MKE Ankaragücü footballers
Mersin İdman Yurdu footballers
Şanlıurfaspor footballers
Denizlispor footballers
Nea Salamis Famagusta FC players
ENPPI SC players
Süper Lig players
TFF First League players
Cypriot First Division players
Egyptian Premier League players
Sportspeople from Monrovia
Expatriate footballers in Turkey
Expatriate footballers in Cyprus
Expatriate footballers in Egypt
Liberian expatriate sportspeople in Turkey
Liberian expatriate sportspeople in Egypt